The Front Page is a 1974 American black comedy-drama film directed by Billy Wilder, and starring Jack Lemmon and Walter Matthau. The screenplay by Wilder and I.A.L. Diamond is based on Ben Hecht and Charles MacArthur's 1928 play of the same name, which inspired several other films and televised movies and series episodes.

Plot 
Chicago Examiner reporter Hildebrand "Hildy" Johnson (Jack Lemmon) has just quit his job in order to marry Peggy Grant (Susan Sarandon) and start a new career, when convict Earl Williams (Austin Pendleton) escapes from death row just prior to his execution. Earl is an impoverished, bumbling leftist whose offense was stuffing fortune cookies with messages demanding the release from death row of the equally overblown murder convictees Sacco and Vanzetti. The Yellow press has painted Earl as another Communist threat from Moscow, meaning that Chicago citizens are anxious to see him also put to death.

Earl has not left the jail, and enters the prison pressroom while Hildy is alone there.  Hildy cannot resist the lure of what could be the biggest scoop of what remains of his career.  Ruthless, egomaniacal managing editor Walter Burns (Walter Matthau), desperate to keep Hildy on the job, encourages him to cover the story, frustrating Peggy, who is eager to catch their train.  When Earl is in danger of being discovered, Mollie Malloy (Carol Burnett), a self-described "$2 whore from Division Street" who befriended Earl, creates a distraction by leaping from the third-floor window.

When Earl is caught, Hildy and Walter are arrested for aiding and abetting a fugitive, but are released when they discover that the mayor and sheriff colluded to conceal Earl's last-minute reprieve by the governor.  Walter grudgingly accepts that he is losing his ace reporter and presents him with a watch as a token of his appreciation.  Hildy and Peggy set off to get married, and Walter telegraphs the next railway station to alert them that the man who stole his watch is on the inbound train and should be apprehended by the police.

Cast 

 Jack Lemmon as Hildebrand 'Hildy' Johnson
 Walter Matthau as Walter Burns
 Susan Sarandon as Peggy Grant
 Vincent Gardenia as Sheriff "Honest Pete" Hartman
 David Wayne as Roy Bensinger
 Allen Garfield as Kruger
 Charles Durning as Murphy
 Herb Edelman as Schwartz
 Austin Pendleton as Earl Williams
 Carol Burnett as Mollie Malloy
 Martin Gabel as Dr. Max J. Eggelhofer
 Harold Gould as The Mayor
 John Furlong as Duffy
 Jon Korkes as Rudy Keppler
 Cliff Osmond as Officer Jacobi
 Paul Benedict as Plunkett, governor's man
 Lou Frizzell as Endicott
 Dick O'Neill as McHugh
 Noam Pitlik as Wilson
 Doro Merande as Jennie, cleaning woman
 Biff Elliot as Police Dispatcher
 Barbara Davis as Myrtle

Allen Jenkins, who had appeared in the 1928 original production, plays a small role as a stenographer. It was his last film role, he died in July 1974.

Production
The original play had been adapted for the screen in 1931 and as His Girl Friday in 1940 (and would be remade once more with 1987's Switching Channels.) Billy Wilder was quoted by his biographer Charlotte Chandler as saying, "I'm against remakes in general ... because if a picture is good, you shouldn't remake it, and if it's lousy, why remake it? ... It was not one of my pictures I was particularly proud of."

After years of producing his films, he passed producing chores to Paul Monash and concentrate on screenwriting and directing when Jennings Lang suggested he film a new adaptation of The Front Page for Universal Pictures. The idea appealed to Wilder, a newspaperman in his younger days, who recalled, "A reporter was a glamorous fellow in those days, the way he wore a hat, and a raincoat, and a swagger, and had his camaraderie with fellow reporters, with local police, always hot on the tail of tips from them and from the fringes of the underworld." Whereas the two earlier screen adaptations of the play were set in their contemporary times, Wilder decided his would be a period piece set in 1929, primarily because the daily newspaper was no longer the dominant news medium in 1974.

Wilder hired Henry Bumstead as production designer. For exterior shots, Bumstead suggested Wilder film in San Francisco, where the buildings were a better match for 1920s Chicago than was Los Angeles. The final scene on the train was filmed in San Francisco, where a railroad enthusiast provided a vintage railway car for the setting. The interior shot of the theater in an earlier scene was done at the Orpheum Theatre in Los Angeles. The opening credits scenes were filmed at the Los Angeles Herald Examiner.

Wilder and Diamond insisted their dialogue be delivered exactly as written and clearly enough to be understood easily. Jack Lemmon, who portrayed Hildy Johnson, later said, "I had one regret about the film. Billy would not let us overlap our lines more. I think that would have made it better ... I feel it's a piece in which you must overlap. But Billy, the writer, wanted to hear all of the words clearly, and he wanted the audience to hear the words. I would have liked to overlap to the point where you lost some of the dialogue."

Two characters not in the play were added to the film. Dr. Eggelhofer, a character only mentioned in the play, appears in the film as an eccentric, sex-obsessed Freudian psychiatrist whose theories are utterly incomprehensible to Williams. The other character added is Rudy Keppler, an young reporter who is seduced in the bathroom by the older reporter Roy Bensinger. In the play, the character of Bensinger was portrayed as effeminate and rather high-strung, suggesting he is gay, but in the film, he is portrayed as a stereotypical campy homosexual whose effeminacy and mincing manners leave no doubt about his sexuality even if he is not explicitly described as gay. Diamond and Wilder also worked in several "in jokes" to the film, such as describing Burns as still being upset with the loss of his star reporter Ben Hecht (who did work as a newsman in 1920s Chicago) to a Hollywood studio.  

Because of Wilder's tendency to "cut in the camera", a form of spontaneous editing that results in a minimal footage being shot, editor Ralph E. Winters was able to assemble a rough cut of the film four days after principal photography was completed.

The film was Wilder's first to show a financial return since The Fortune Cookie (1966), and his last box office hit of any significance. The director regretted not sticking to his instincts over remakes.

Reception

Box office
The film earned North American theatrical rentals of $7,460,000.

Critical reception
Vincent Canby of The New York Times thought the story was "a natural" for Wilder and Diamond, who "have a special (and, to my mind, very appealing) appreciation for vulgar, brilliant con artists of monumental tackiness." He continued, "Even though the mechanics and demands of movie-making slow what should be the furious tempo, this Front Page displays a giddy bitterness that is rare in any films except those of Mr. Wilder. It is also, much of the time, extremely funny." He described Walter Matthau and Austin Pendleton as "marvelous" and added, "Mr. Lemmon is comparatively reserved as the flamboyant Hildy, never quite letting go of his familiar comic personality to become dominated by the lunacies of the farce. He always remains a little outside it, acting. Carol Burnett has an even tougher time as Molly Malloy . . . This role may well be impossible, however, since it requires the actress to play for straight melodrama while everyone around her is going for laughs . . . Mr. Wilder has great fun with the period newspaper detail . . . and admires his various supporting actors to such an extent that he allows them to play as broadly as they could possibly desire." He concluded, "The hysteria is not as consistent as one might wish, nor, indeed, as epic as in Mr. Wilder's own One, Two, Three. The cohesive force is, instead, the director's fondness for frauds, which, I suspect, is really an admiration for people who barrel on through life completely intimidating those who should know better."

The British television network Channel 4 called it the "least satisfying screen adaptation of Hecht and MacArthur's play," saying it "adds little to the mix other than a bit of choice language. The direction is depressingly flat and stagy, Wilder running on empty. While it is easy to see why he was attracted to this material . . . he just does not seem to have the energy here to do it justice. Matthau and Lemmon put in their usual faultless turns, but cannot lift a pervading air of pointlessness."

TV Guide rated the film 2 out of four stars and noted, "This slick remake of the ebullient original falls short of being the film it could have been, despite the presence of master filmmaker Wilder and his engaging costars . . . Despite the obvious charismatic interaction between Lemmon and Matthau, the film is oddly stilted. In an overly emphatic turn, the miscast Burnett easily gives the most awful performance of her career. She projects only one emotion - a gratingly annoying hysteria. One never enjoys the film so much as when her character throws herself out of a window."

Burnett said in This Time Together that she was so displeased with her performance that when she was on an airplane where the film was shown, she apologized on the plane's intercom.

On Rotten Tomatoes, The Front Page holds a rating of 60% from 30 reviews.

Awards
The film was nominated for the Golden Globe Award for Best Motion Picture - Musical or Comedy but lost to The Longest Yard, and Lemmon and Matthau, competing with each other for the Golden Globe Award for Best Actor – Motion Picture Musical or Comedy, lost to Art Carney in Harry and Tonto.

Wilder and Diamond were nominated for the Writers Guild of America Award for Best Comedy Adapted from Another Medium but lost to Lionel Chetwynd and Mordecai Richler for The Apprenticeship of Duddy Kravitz.

Wilder won the David di Donatello Award for Best Director of a Foreign Film, and Lemmon and Matthau shared Best Foreign Actor honors with Burt Lancaster for Conversation Piece.

Home media
GoodTimes Entertainment released the Region 1 DVD on June 17, 1998. The film is in fullscreen format with an audio track in English and subtitles in English, Spanish, and French. On May 31, 2005, it was re-released in a widescreen edition DVD by Universal Home Video. Kino Lorber released the film on Blu-ray on August 6, 2019.

In popular culture
In the 2019 bio-pic Dolemite Is My Name, Rudy Ray Moore (Eddie Murphy) goes to a screening of The Front Page with friends, and finds the film unfunny. Moore, an African-American, is further stunned by the riotous reaction to the movie by the (mostly white) audience in the theater. Moore is ironically inspired by this experience (and the lack of films made by and for African Americans) to make his own film (1975's Dolemite.)

See also
 List of American films of 1974

Trivia

The song performed by Peggy Grant is "Button up your overcoat",  published in 1928, and was originally first introduced by vocalist Ruth Etting.

References

Sources

External links

1974 films
1970s black comedy films
1970s romantic comedy-drama films
American black comedy films
American films based on plays
American romantic comedy-drama films
American screwball comedy films
1970s English-language films
Films about capital punishment
Films about journalists
Films directed by Billy Wilder
Films scored by Billy May
Films set in Chicago
Films set in 1929
Films with screenplays by Billy Wilder
Universal Pictures films
1974 comedy films
1974 drama films
1970s American films